Henry Ulke (January 29, 1821 – February 17, 1910) was an American photographer and portrait painter.

Biography
Henry Ulke was born in Frankenstein in Schlesien, Prussia, and studied painting in Breslau, and also in Berlin under Wach. For a time he was occupied in decorating the Royal Museum of Berlin, but became involved in the Revolution of 1848, and was compelled to leave his native land.

Ulke and his brothers Julian and Lee moved from Germany to the United States in 1852.  Ulke worked in New York designing banknotes, then illustrations for Harper's and Leslie's weeklies in Philadelphia from approximately 1853 to 1860. They settled in Washington, D.C., in 1860, finding residence in the Petersen boarding house at 516 Tenth Street, NW, across the street from Ford's Theater, where President Abraham Lincoln was shot by John Wilkes Booth on April 14, 1865. It is presumed that Julian Ulke took a famous photo of the Petersen house room in which Lincoln died on the morning of April 15.

The brothers had a portrait studio in Washington, D.C. at 1111 Pennsylvania Avenue, N.W., around the corner from their boarding house. For 40 years, Ulke painted portraits of a series of American politicians, scientists and noteworthy individuals — some from his own photos.  Portraits include Earls Elgin and Gray, Sir Frederick Bruce, Robert Kennicott, William Stimpson, Edwin M. Stanton, Charles Sumner, James G. Blaine, Treasury Secretaries Crawford, Taney, Bibb, Chase, and Carlisle, Generals Grant, Rawlins, and Blair, as well as Samuel D. Ingham (1893).

Ulke was a member of the Smithsonian Megatherium Club, and collected beetles. His beetle collection has been called "one of the largest and most perfect collections of the beetles of North America in existence". He donated his collection to the Carnegie Museum. Ulke photographed Mary Lincoln in mourning after Willie Lincoln's death.

Ulke died in Washington, D.C. in 1910. His New York Times obituary says, "Henry Ulke, whose portraits of Presidents and Cabinet Ministers at Washington gained for him the soubriquet of 'Painter of Presidents,' died ... as the result of a fall at his home... He was 89 years old.  Mr. Ulke was a personal friend of Abraham Lincoln, and at the time of the assassination the dying President was carried into the famous Tenth Street house, where he was boarding.  One of Mr. Ulke's best paintings was a portrait of President Grant, which now hangs in the long gallery of the White House..." Ulke was buried at Oak Hill Cemetery in Washington, D.C.

Family
Ulke married Veronica Schultze in 1865.

Notes

References
Andrew J. Cosentino and Henry H. Glassie. The Capital Image: Painters in Washington, 1800–1915. Washington, D.C.: Smithsonian Institution Press for the National Museum of American Art, 1983.
 This source says he came to the United States in 1849.

External links

 

American entomologists
1821 births
1910 deaths
Painters from Washington, D.C.
American people of German descent
German-American Forty-Eighters
People from Mittelsachsen
Accidental deaths from falls
Accidental deaths in Washington, D.C.
19th-century American painters
American male painters
20th-century American painters
19th-century American photographers
20th-century American photographers
19th-century American male artists
20th-century American male artists
Burials at Oak Hill Cemetery (Washington, D.C.)